Philippe Halfon is the head of internal medicine and infectious disease at the European Hospital of Marseille (Hôpital européen de Marseille). He is a specialist in viral diseases, especially on Human Immunodeficiency Virus (HIV) and Hepatitis C Virus (HCV).

Medical education
Halfon received a PharmD from the University of Pharmacy of Aix-Marseille University in 1984, and certificates of higher studies in hematology (1985), immunology (1986), bacteriology-virology (1985), parasitology (1987), cellular biology (1990), molecular biology (1991) and AIDS (1992).

He received his PhD from the University of Luminy, Aix-Marseille University (1996-1999), and his MD from the University of Medicine of Marseille (1998-2006).

During 1984-1987 Halfon was a resident in microbiology at the Medical Centre of the University Hospital of Marseilles. After that, he was a Junior Resident in Biology for two years in Médaille d’or des Hôpitaux. He was a senior Resident in Virology between 1987 and1988 at the Medical Center of the University Hospital of Marseilles. This was followed by fellowships in Clinical Microbiology and Biochemistry between 1989 and 1995, and then a fellow in Clinical Infectious Diseases and Internal Medicine at the University Hospital of Marseille (2003- 2007) and Senior Resident in Infectious Diseases In Montreal, Canada (2001).

Career

He was appointed Research Director (HDR) at the University of Medicine of Marseille (2003). Halfon was an Infectious Diseases Specialist (2009), obtained an Oncology and Genetic certification (2015), and became associate professor of internal medicine at Paris Hospital College.

He has also been a visiting professor of medicine at Emory University, Atlanta, Georgia, (2008), and Visiting professor of medicine, Hadassah, Jerusalem; Israel (2009).

Halfon is also the co-founder of Alphabio Clinical Laboratories, and co-founder and CEO of Genoscience Pharma.

Research
Halfon's research deals with cancer and virology. On these topics, he has written 250 peer-reviewed articles.

In addition, he has developed a potential new drug against Sars-CoV-2, GNS561, with in vitro antiviral activity against SARS-CoV-2 through autophagy inhibition.

Companies 
Halfon is the president and founder of Alphabio, a clinical network of clinical laboratory in Marseille. Its main product is iBiote, a microbiota analysis service.

He founded Genoscience Pharma in 2001. The company was initially focused on the development of anti-HCV agents. Two protease inhibitors were thus developed and out-licensed to BioLineRx: BL-8020, an orally administered treatment for Hepatitis C, and BL-8030, a second-generation NS3 protease inhibitor for oral treatment of Hepatitis C,

Halfon is also co-founder, together with Noam Danenberg, of Panmed Inc., a biomedical investment firm which was one of the owners of BL8020, an add-on drug to treat HCV non-responders.

References

External links
 Official Website
 genosceincepharma
 alphabio
 Dépistage de la fibrose par les tests non invasifs - P. Halfon - Vidéo lors des 85èmes journées de l’AFEF au Palais du Pharo, Marseille, 02/10/2019
 Vidéo La Provence 18:18, 19/08/2020

Living people
People from Tunis
Aix-Marseille University alumni
Physicians from Marseille
French virologists
Year of birth missing (living people)